Citypoint (previously known as Britannic House and Britannic Tower) is a building  located on Ropemaker Street on the northern fringe of the City of London, the main financial district and historic nucleus of London.

The designers were F. Milton Cashmore and H. N. W. Grosvenor. In 1991 British Petroleum moved back to their original headquarters on Finsbury Circus and the building was renamed Britannic Tower.

The designer for the refurbishment was Sheppard Robson. It was renamed Citypoint after its refurbishment.

Citypoint is the 11th-tallest building in the City and the 57th-tallest in Greater London.

In August 2005 its owner, Pillar Properties, sold the building for more than £500 million in one of the largest deals ever seen in the City office market.

In early 2007 the building was again put on the market, this time for £650 million, and purchased by Beacon Capital Partners, a private American company. At the time it was the most expensive building sale in the United Kingdom. A few months later, the sale of 8 Canada Square at Canary Wharf eclipsed this when it was sold for over £1 billion.

A number of other large buildings have been constructed nearby, including The Heron, a 36-storey  residential tower at Milton Court and a  office tower at Ropemaker Place developed by British Land.

Image gallery

See also
Moor House
Moorgate
List of tallest buildings and structures in London

References

External links
Citypoint on Skyscrapernews.com
from emporis.com

Skyscrapers in the City of London
Buildings and structures in the City of London
Office buildings completed in 1967
Office buildings completed in 2000
BP buildings and structures
Skyscraper office buildings in London